An electric vertical take-off and landing (eVTOL) aircraft is a variety of VTOL (vertical take-off and landing) aircraft that uses electric power to hover, take off, and land vertically. This technology came about thanks to major advances in electric propulsion (motors, batteries, fuel cells, electronic controllers) and the emerging need for new aerial vehicles for urban air mobility that can enable greener and quieter flights. Electric and hybrid propulsion systems (EHPS) have also the potential of lowering the operating costs of aircraft.

Original eVTOL aircraft designs are being developed by original equipment manufacturers (OEMs) that include legacy manufacturers such as Airbus, Boeing, Embraer, Honda, Hyundai, and Toyota, as well as several start-up companies including Archer Aviation, EHang, Joby Aviation, Overair, and Volocopter. This ecosystem of firms developing eVTOLs includes also spin-off of legacy aircraft manufacturers, such as Eve Air Mobility that emerged from the EmbraerX division of Embraer, as well as partnerships, such as Wisk Aero that was launched as a joint venture between Boeing and Larry Page's Kitty Hawk.

History

The concept of eVTOL aircraft emerged in 2009 when a video of the NASA Puffin eVTOL concept went viral on November 11, 2009, showcasing a single person concept rendering of the technology, and concept in flight.  Following this, the first Puffin paper at the VFS Specialists Conference on Aeromechanics, on January 9, 2010.  This concept utilized a new technology developed at NASA called Distributed Electric Propulsion (DEP).  Additional Puffin papers were published on September 13 at the 10th AIAA ATIO Conference, NASA Puffin Electric Tailsitter VTOL Concept and Puffin Redundant Electric Powertrain System. This was fast followed in 2011 by several industry efforts, namely the AugustaWestland Project Zero (Italy), the Volocopter VC1 (Germany) and the Opener BlackFly (US). It was officially introduced by the Vertical Flight Society and the American Institute of Aeronautics and Astronautics (AIAA) in 2014 during the "Transformative Vertical Flight Concepts Joint Workshop on Enabling New Flight Concepts through Novel Propulsion and Energy Architectures" held in Virginia.

Since then, there has been a significant increase in interest among aircraft manufacturers for eVTOLs, and companies such as Boeing, Airbus and Bell have also worked on the technology:

 Airbus A³ Vahana introduced in 2017 at the Paris Air Show, first flight in January 2018
 Boeing - Aurora Flight Sciences PAV, in development since 2017,  first flight in 2019
 Bell Nexus 6HX unveiled at the CESp 2019

In addition to these major aircraft manufacturers, startups have been playing an important role in the development of these air vehicles and had sometimes been leaders in technological advances.

Uber published a paper on a project called Elevate co-authored by Jeff Holden, Nikhil Goel, and Mark Moore. The paper outlined the feasibility of an on-demand aviation transportation system. That document, along with subsequent annual Elevate summits the company hosted from 2017 to 2019, helped advance the concepts of eVTOL aircraft and urban air mobility (UAM) from a science-fiction concept to a potential aerospace sector pursued by dozens of development projects.

In December, 2020, Uber's Elevate was acquired by Joby Aviation. Upon acquisition, Joby CEO JoeBen Bivert said, "The team at Uber Elevate has not only played an important role in our industry, they have also developed a remarkable set of software tools that build on more than a decade of experience enabling on-demand mobility."

In 2020, Tetra Aviation won the "disruptor award" at the GoFly personal flight contest for its single-seat eVTOL. In 2021, the company announced its Mk5 personal eVTOL that it expects to deliver in 2022. It incorporates 32 vertical lift rotors distributed across long, thin front and rear wings, along with a rear pusher prop for cruising. It uses a mostly aluminum frame, with carbon-fiber/aramid-reinforced polymer bodywork. The battery pack holds 13.5-kWh. The vehicle features at least three flight controllers, driving 32 vertical propellers in the case of motor or flight controller failure, with a parachute in the event of total failure. The plane is to be sold as an experimental kit aircraft that requires only a private pilot license.

In 2021, Urban eVTOL announced the Leo,  a 3-seat,  vehicle. It hosts 16 40-cm diameter, 10-kw ducted fans for vertical lift, and 6 28 cm diameter, turbine-bladed rear engines for horizontal thrust. The wing is  a double box-wing design. The intent is that it be small enough to park in a standard automobile space. The split battery system holds 66-kWh. A ballistic parachute is included. It has yet to fly.

In 2021, Volocopter conducted South Korea's first crewed eVTOL flight.

In November 2021, the National Academy of Sciences published a study by Shashank Sripad and Venkat Viswanathan of Carnegie Mellon University that showed eVTOL aircraft could have an energy efficiency that is comparable to or higher than terrestrial electric vehicles. The study also assigned a high technological readiness level for battery-powered eVTOLs.

In October 2020 with a $60 million investment in Joby Aviation, a business building an electric vertical takeoff and landing (eVTOL) aircraft intended to provide air cab service, Delta joined the list of airlines funding EV technology startups.

Agility Prime 
Four American companies have military airworthiness contracts through the US military's Agility Prime program: Joby Aviation, Beta Technologies, Lift Aircraft, and most recently Kitty Hawk, whose Heaviside aircraft was accepted in July 2021.

SPACs 

Archer, Joby, Lilium, and Vertical joined special-purpose acquisition companies (SPAC) to go public. The first was Archer Aviation, who simultaneously announced a $1,000,000,000 order of 200+ aircraft from United Airlines in February 2021.  Archer was also the first to publicly reveal its Maker aircraft in-person that year.

Orders 
Vertical Aerospace announced pre-orders for 1,000 eVTOLs in June 2021, including from American Airlines, Virgin Atlantic and aircraft lessor, Avalon Holdings.

As of January 2022, Embraer Eve Air Mobility signed contracts with seventeen companies for 1,735 orders of EVE eVTOLs, valued at US$ 5 billion.

Technology

Flight mechanisms 
Many designs operate without wings. Multicopters typically use radial arms to host the motors/propellers, such as the Volcopter 2X or the Jetson Aero.

Vectored thrust designs change the direction of thrust, vectoring thrust vertically for takeoff/landing and horizontally while cruising. The entire wing (tilt-wing) can pivot to or just the rotors (tilt-rotor). The Archer Maker, Lilium Jet, Joby S4, Vertical Aerospace VA-X4, and Zuri 2.0 are tilt-rotor craft. The ASML Aero Vertiia uses a hybrid that pivots the rotor-holding part of its otherwise fixed box wing design. Another approach to thrust vectoring is to use flaps to divert air coming from a horizontal motor downward to create lift. Craft Aero is notable for its box wing that is attached to the bottom of the fuselage in the front and the top of the fuselage in the back, presenting a diamond shape when viewed from above. The design includes a turbine generator for increased range. Odys Aviation vectors thrust from its 16 motors by extending flaps that direct the backward-traveling air downward at take-off and landing.

Tilt-wing configurations pivot the frocio wing along with its attached motors like Dufour Aerospace.

Lift and cruise systems use one set of motors for vertical flight and another set for cruising, such as Beta Alia, Airbus, and eMagic.

PteroDynamics uses a folding wing design that allows easy storage land transport of the vehicle. Takeoff occurs with the wings in the folded position, with an in-flight transition to fully extended.

Hybrid designs employ some fixed and some tilting motors, as shown by Archer Maker, Vertical Aerospace VA-1X, and Wisk Cora.

Wing design 
Typical multicopters do not use wings, relying exclusively on the turning blades for lift.

Tandem wing designs use front and rear wings, optionally attached to each other at the wing tips.

Box wing or closed wing designs also use two wings, but the wings are connected in such a way that the wingtips are eliminated. The wings may be vertically stacked or arranged front and rear as in tandem designs.

Enclosing wing designs open to expose the lift-off fans, and close around them for faster higher-speed cruising.

Power 
Most current designs are powered by batteries, although some designs use hydrogen fuel cells. Currently, batteries suffer from low specific energy (causing range and thus safety issues). Fuel cells have previously suffered from lower specific power (which could be too low for vertical takeoff/landing), but newer designs claim to have solved this problem with much higher specific power. There are also proposals to use batteries for takeoff/landing, and hydrogen fuel cells for cruising.

Use cases

On-demand passenger services 

Many eVTOL's concept are for Air Taxi application. For instance, Pipistrel, an Uber Elevate partner, is working on the Pipistrel 801, a 5 seats air taxi. Another example is Volocopter, which proposed its air taxi service called VoloCity, based on the Volocopter 2X.

Parcels and deliveries 
The Google-owned company Alphabet has been offering an eVTOL UAV delivery service since 2020. Their drones are able to fly up to 100 km and carry up to 1.5 kg. Amazon Air and UPS are two others companies using drone delivery. A German aerospace company called Wingcopter in collaboration with UNICEF has also delivered vaccines in Vanuatu in 2018. In 2020 wingcopter eVTOL drone was used to deliver COVID-19 test kits to Isle of Mull.

Air cargo 

Heavy-lift unmanned air vehicles included companies such as Sabrewing Aircraft Company Sabrewing Rhaegal, Elroy Elroy Air Chaparral and Pipistrel have unveiled heavy-lift uncrewed cargo aircraft, with the Sabrewing aircraft having a capacity to carry a payload of up to 5,400 pounds in a vertical take off scenario. Volocopter has also developed a cargo eVTOL aircraft, the VoloDrone, that can carry up to 200 kg with a maximum range of 40 km.

Emergency medical services (EMS) 
In 2020, JumpAero announced it was working on a small, one-seater eVTOL aircraft to allow the rapid deployment of emergency services. This type of vehicle is not a replacement for land vehicles or helicopters, but a new tool that, thanks to the electric motor, is faster than the others.

In 2020, the Canadian Advanced Air Mobility (CAAM) consortium studied the benefits of eVTOL for direct hospital-to-hospital transportation of patients, organs and drugs.

Recreational flights 
eVTOL aircraft have been created to introduce electric flight into recreational or sporting aviation, such as racing series Airspeeder.

Military applications 

In April 2020, the USAF announced $25 million-worth funding of eVTOL projects for development in 2021. On August 20, 2020, United States Air Force (USAF) held a demonstration flight of an electric vertical take-off and landing aircraft at Camp Mabry in Austin, Texas. It was the first time that a manned eVTOL aircraft took flight under USAF Agility Prime programme.

On 12 December 2021, Embraer and BAE Systems announced plans to embark on a joint study to explore the development of Eve’s vehicle for the defence and security market.

Certification

Europe 
Since 2018, the European Union Aviation Safety Agency (EASA) has been working on the certification of such aircraft. In July 2019, they published the SC-VTOL-01 : Special Condition for VTOL aircraft. This document established the safety and design objectives for VTOL aircraft. It includes a special section for eVTOL.

United States 
The US Federal Aviation Administration (FAA) published a study in 2009 on general aviation recommendations for the next 20 years. In particular Part 23-Amendment 64 includes eVTOL.

See also 

 Air taxi
 NASA Puffin
Boeing Passenger Air Vehicle
 EHang
 Opener BlackFly
 Lilium Jet
 Pipistrel 801 eVTOL
 Vertical Aerospace
 Eve Air Mobility

References

External links  
 

VTOL aircraft
Urban air mobility
Aircraft by type